Quảng Thọ may refer to several places in Vietnam, including:

 , a ward of Sầm Sơn.
 Quảng Thọ, Quảng Bình, a ward of Ba Đồn.
 , a rural commune of Quảng Điền District.